Cara Readle (born 8 January 1991) is a Welsh actress from Swansea, Wales, known mainly for her role as Layla in The Story of Tracy Beaker from series three to five.

Early life and career 
Readle, formally known as Melissa, was born in Swansea to an English father, Alan and Welsh mother, Tracy and raised in Mumbles, and has cerebral palsy. The characters she played in Zig Zag Love and The Story of Tracy Beaker also have this condition. In November 2009, she also had a part in Casualty, playing a patient with cerebral palsy called Serena Wark. The character's sister, Shona Wark, portrayed by Evelyn Hoskins, has reappeared several times as a recurring character, becoming involved in a storyline centring on character Charlie Fairhead (Derek Thompson), but despite this, Serena has never reappeared.

Cara more recently worked with BBC Ouch! to share life experiences about her disability. From 2011, she has starred in the BBC Wales series Baker Boys as Elen, the daughter of Eve Myles' character Sarah. In 2014, she featured in episode 5 (of 8) of the Sky One drama The Smoke alongside Jodie Whittaker, starring as a receptionist. From 2021 to 2022 she featured in CBeebies show Biff & Chip as Sam.

References

External links

BBC page for Layla
Presenter Cerrie Burnell chats to actress Cara Readle
TV's Gail Porter meets actor Cara Readle
Actress calls for more disabled people on TV
Give me the same chances on set
"I'm not aware of breaking new ground, acting is what I do"

1991 births
Welsh child actresses
British television actresses
Living people
Welsh people of English descent
Actresses from Swansea
People with cerebral palsy
Welsh people with disabilities
21st-century Welsh actresses